The John Troupes Three-Decker is a historic triple decker house in Worcester, Massachusetts.  When it was listed on the National Register of Historic Places in 1990, this 1918 building was noted for its well preserved Colonial Revival details, included bracketed cornices, wide bands of shingling between clapboarded sections, and porches supported by Doric columns.  Subsequent residing and alteration of the exterior has removed or covered over most of these features (see photo).

See also
National Register of Historic Places listings in southwestern Worcester, Massachusetts
National Register of Historic Places listings in Worcester County, Massachusetts

References

Apartment buildings on the National Register of Historic Places in Massachusetts
Colonial Revival architecture in Massachusetts
Houses completed in 1918
Apartment buildings in Worcester, Massachusetts
Triple-decker apartment houses
National Register of Historic Places in Worcester, Massachusetts